This article provides details of international football games played by the Hungary national football team from 1902 to 1929.

Between their first match in 1902 and 1929, Hungary played in 139 matches, resulting in 71 victories, 27 draws and 41 defeats. Throughout this period they played in the 1912 Summer Olympics, in which Hungary won the consolation tournament after beating Austria 3-0 in the final. Notable figures during these years was Imre Schlosser who become the first player to score 50 international goals during this period, including a hat-trick in the consolation tournament semi-finals against Germany.

Results

1902

1903

1904

1905

1906

1907

1908

1909

1910

1911

1912

1913

1914

1915

1916

1917

1918

1919

1920

1921

1922

1923

1924

1925

1926

1927

1928

1929

References 

Football in Hungary
Hungary national football team results
1900s in Hungarian sport
1910s in Hungarian sport
1920s in Hungarian sport